Alain Daniel Shekomba Okende (born 13 April 1970, Kananga) is a Congolese physicist, businessman, and politician. Formerly a professor at the University of Kinshasa, where he had been a student. He was a presidential candidate in the 2018 Democratic Republic of the Congo general election.

References

External links

1970 births
People from Kananga
Candidates for President of the Democratic Republic of the Congo
Democratic Republic of the Congo politicians
University of Kinshasa alumni
Living people
21st-century Democratic Republic of the Congo people